The Crimson Trail is a 1935 American Western film directed by Alfred Raboch and written by Jack Natteford. The film stars Buck Jones, Polly Ann Young, Ward Bond, John Bleifer, Paul Fix and Carl Stockdale. The film was released on March 11, 1935, by Universal Pictures.

Plot

Cast 
Buck Jones as Billy Carter
Polly Ann Young as Kitty Bellair
Ward Bond as Luke Long
John Bleifer as Loco 
Paul Fix as Paul 
Carl Stockdale as Jim Bellair
Charles K. French as Frank Carter 
Charles Brinley as Tom
Bob Kortman as Henchman Cal
Bud Osborne as Henchman Jack

References

External links 
 

1935 films
1930s English-language films
American Western (genre) films
1935 Western (genre) films
Universal Pictures films
American black-and-white films
1930s American films